Alper Saruhan (born September 4, 1982 in İstanbul, Turkey) is a Turkish professional basketball player who played for Pınar Karşıyaka, Trabzonspor Basketball, Oyak Renault, Manisa BB, Sakarya BŞB Basketball, Muratbey Uşak, Türk Telekom. He is a 2.00 m (6 ft 7 in) and 91 kg (200 lbs) weight small forward.

External links
TBLStat.net Profile
Twitter Account

1982 births
Living people
Karşıyaka basketball players
Small forwards
Turkish men's basketball players
Trabzonspor B.K. players
People from Istanbul